A general election was held in the U.S. state of South Dakota on November 4, 2014. All of South Dakota's executive officers were up for election as well as a United States Senate seat and South Dakota's at-large seat in the United States House of Representatives. Primary elections were held on June 3, 2014.

Governor and Lieutenant Governor

Attorney General

Incumbent Republican Attorney General Marty Jackley ran for re-election to a second full term in office. The Democratic Party ran no candidate for this office, which left Chad Haber of the Libertarian Party to be Jackley's only challenger.

Secretary of State

Incumbent Republican Secretary of State Jason Gant decided to retire rather than run for re-election to a second term in office.

State Treasurer
Incumbent Republican State Treasurer Richard Sattgast ran for re-election to a second term in office.

State Auditor

Incumbent Republican State Auditor Steve Barnett ran for re-election to a second term in office. The Democratic Party ran no candidate for this office, which left Kurt Evans of the Libertarian Party to be Barnett's only challenger.

Commissioner of School and Public Lands
Incumbent Republican Commissioner of School and Public Lands Vern Larson, who was appointed to the office in August 2013 after Commissioner Jarrod Johnson resigned, did not run for election, as per the terms of his appointment.

Public Utilities Commissioner
Incumbent Republican Public Utilities Commission Chairman Gary Hanson ran for re-election to a third six-year term in office.

United States Senate

United States House of Representatives

References